Khmara may refer to:

Khmara (surname)
Khmara Island
Khmara Bay